Daniel Follonier (born 18 January 1994) is a Swiss footballer who plays as a winger for SC Cham.

Club career 
Follonier is a youth exponent from Sion and started playing for their Under-21 squad in the fourth-tier 1. Liga in the 2011–12 season. He made his Swiss Super League debut at 18 May 2014 against Grasshopper in 3-1 home win. In July 2018, after appearing in 14 matches and having scored 1 goal for Luzern, he signed for Servette on loan.

Honours 
Sion
Swiss Cup: 2014–15

References

1994 births
People from Sierre
Sportspeople from Valais
Living people
Swiss men's footballers
Association football wingers
Switzerland youth international footballers
FC Sion players
FC Luzern players
Servette FC players
SC Kriens players
SC Cham players
Swiss Super League players
Swiss Challenge League players
Swiss Promotion League players
Swiss 1. Liga (football) players